Queen Wonhye of the Ansan Gim clan (d. 31 July 1022), posthumously and commonly known as Queen Mother Wonhye was the 4th wife of King Hyeonjong of Goryeo, younger sister of Queen Wonseong and elder sister of Queen Wonpyeong.

Life
She was born into the Ansan Gim clan as the mid and second daughter of Gim Eun-bu (김은부) and Lady Yi, daughter of Yi Heo-gyeom (이허겸) from the Incheon Yi clan. Alongside her elder sister, she entered King Hyeonjong's palace around 1011 CE. She was honoured as Princess Anbok (안복궁주, 安福宮主) while living in Anbok Palace (안복궁, 安福宮). This later changed into Princess Yeondeok (연덕궁주, 延德宮主) when she moved to Yeondeok Palace (연덕궁, 延德宮).

Death and legacy
In 1022, the 13th year of her husband's reign, Lady Gim died. Three years later, she was posthumously honoured as a queen consort. She was also honoured as Queen Pyeonggyeong (평경왕후, 平敬王后) in 1027 and buried in Hoereung Tomb (회릉, 懷陵). 

After her eldest son ascended the throne as King Munjong, Lady Gim became honored as Queen Mother (태후, 太后). Beside Munjong, she bore a son and a daughter, the latter of whom would marry King Deokjong.

References

External links 
Queen Wonhye on Encykorea .
원혜태후 on Doosan Encyclopedia .
Queen Wonhe on Goryeosa .

10th-century births
Year of birth unknown
1022 deaths
Consorts of Hyeonjong of Goryeo
11th-century Korean women